Peach Point Plantation is a historic site, it was a plantation and the homestead and domicile of many early Texas settlers, located in Jones Creek, Brazoria County, Texas. The land was operated as a working slave plantation from 1832 until 1863 with cotton and sugar cane as the primary cash crops. The early Texas settlers that lived at Peach Point included Emily Austin Perry, James Franklin Perry, William Joel Bryan, Stephen Fuller Austin, and Guy Morrison Bryan.

Location

Peach Point Plantation originally encompasses many square miles; today within these land boundaries are official Texas Historical Markers including the marker for Emily Margaret Austin Bryan Perry, the marker for Stephen F. Austin, and, additionally, every marker found at Gulf Prairie Cemetery (which was sometimes referred to as Peach Point Cemetery) located at State Highway 36 and County Road 304 in Jones Creek, Texas.

Name
Peach Point Plantation was originally referred to as Perry's Landing, after its owner, James F. Perry.  The name selected, however, was Peach Point Plantation, in recognition of all the wild peaches growing in the vicinity at the time of its establishment. The name Peach Point Plantation is sometimes shortened to "Peach Point." At a later point it was named the Peach Point Wildlife Management Area (Peach Point WMA).

History 
The Mexican Government had owned the league of land. As an empresario, Stephen F. Austin had been granted the right to settle on land, in exchange for taking responsibility for settling the area with others. Stephen F. Austin owned this tract of land by 1830, and sold the property in 1832 to his brother-in-law James Franklin Perry and sister Emily Austin Perry for $300.00. 

James Franklin Perry and his wife Emily Austin Perry managed Peach Point Plantation, alongside his son Stephen Samuel Perry.

Plantation 
The early years of the plantation were primarily cotton producing cash crops with the forced labor of enslaved people. The plantation additionally produced farm items such as eggs, pork, or vegetables for personal use, selling any excess to Robert Mills and to other local merchants. By 1845, they started growing sugar cane, which became their primary crop by the 1850s.

The main plantation manor house was destroyed in 1909 during the 1909 Grand Isle hurricane, with the exception of two rooms. The two remaining rooms were once Stephen F. Austin's office and bedroom at Peach Point, and by 1948 they needed to be restored. The following year in 1949, the family built a new residence a few feet away from the former plantation manor house.

With the birth of each of his children, Stephen Samuel Perry planted an oak tree on the property. Though the 1900 Galveston hurricane and the Grand Isle Hurricane of 1909 destroyed many structures at the Plantation, two of these oak trees (quercus virginiana) still survive in the present era.

Notable visitors
Notable figures of the era visited the Austin, Perry, and the Bryan families at Peach Point plantation including Rutherford B. Hayes, Leonidas Polk, Thomas J. Pilgrim, and Gail Borden. Stephen F. Austin's original place of burial (before being moved to Austin, Texas), is located at or very near Peach Point Plantation, at the Gulf Prairie Cemetery (also known as Gulph Prairie). Peach Point Plantation is referenced in another historic marker, the Old Oakland Plantation Marker.

Present-day
Parts of the land tract are still owned by direct descendants of the original owners. Previous owners and / or partial owners include Stephen Samuel Perry Jr. and Stephen F. Austin. 

Much of the land, previously called the Peach Point Wildlife Management Area, is now known as the Justin Hurst Wildlife Management Area and it covers approx. 12,000-acres owned by the Texas Parks and Wildlife Department.

References

Further reading

James Franklin and Stephen Samuel Perry Papers, Dolph Briscoe Center for American History, University of Texas at Austin. E. W. Winkler, ed.,
"The Bryan-Hayes Correspondence," Southwestern Historical Quarterly 25 (October 1921-April 1922).
Eugene C. Barker, ed., The Austin Papers (3 vols., Washington: GPO, 1924–28).
David B. Gracy II, Moses Austin: His Life (San Antonio: Trinity University Press, 1987).

Buildings and structures in Brazoria County, Texas
Cotton plantations in Texas
Sugar plantations in Texas